The 2002 Tour de France was the 89th edition of Tour de France, one of cycling's Grand Tours. The Tour began in Luxembourg City with a prologue individual time trial on 6 July and Stage 11 occurred on 18 July with a flat stage from Pau. The race finished on the Champs-Élysées in Paris on 28 July.

Stage 11
18 July 2002 — Pau to La Mongie (Col du Tourmalet),

Stage 12
19 July 2002 — Lannemezan to Plateau-de-Beille,

Stage 13
20 July 2002 — Lavelanet to Béziers,

Stage 14
21 July 2002 — Lodève to Mont Ventoux,

Stage 15
23 July 2002 — Vaison-la-Romaine to Les Deux Alpes,

Stage 16
24 July 2002 — Les Deux Alpes to La Plagne,

Stage 17
25 July 2002 — Aime to Cluses,

Stage 18
26 July 2002 — Cluses to Bourg-en-Bresse,

Stage 19
27 July 2002 — Régnié-Durette to Mâcon,  (individual time trial)

Stage 20
28 July 2002 — Melun to Paris Champs-Élysées,

References

cyclingnews

, Stage 11 To Stage 20, 2002 Tour de France
Tour de France stages